The Punk Singer is a 2013 documentary film about feminist singer Kathleen Hanna who fronted the bands Bikini Kill and Le Tigre, and who was a central figure in the riot grrrl movement. Directed by filmmaker Sini Anderson and produced by Anderson and Tamra Davis, the film's title is taken from the Julie Ruin song "The Punk Singer", from Hanna's 1998 solo effort.

Synopsis
Using a combination of interviews and archival footage including live band performances, the film traces the life and career of Hanna from her troubled upbringing and her start in spoken word performance poetry, through her riot grrrl zines, her prominent punk and dance-punk bands, her coining of the phrase "Smells Like Teen Spirit" for Kurt Cobain, her solo career as Julie Ruin, her feminist activism, her marriage to Beastie Boys member Adam Horovitz, and ending with Hanna's 2010 diagnosis of late-stage Lyme disease and the severe treatments she endures to combat it.

Production
Anderson filmed Hanna off and on for a year starting in July 2010. Hanna had already amassed a collection of archival footage and ephemera; these and further finds were worked into the documentary. Horovitz appears as a strong, steadying supporter of his wife, and he filmed one of the more troubling scenes himself. Co-producer Davis, the wife of Beastie Boy Mike D, came to the project near the end to help finish it. Anderson funded the film through various ways, initially with a benefit concert including Sonic Youth's Kim Gordon performing at the Knitting Factory and then through a Kickstarter campaign which raised $46,000. The film, Anderson's first feature-length documentary, premiered in March 2013 at SXSW (South by Southwest) in Austin, Texas, where it was positively reviewed. The film was picked up for distribution in North America by Sundance Selects. On November 29, 2013, its general theatrical release was initiated in New York and Los Angeles, as well as a digital release on iTunes.

The film was the first public announcement of Hanna's battle with Lyme disease. Since 2005, Hanna had been struggling with symptoms of the disease without knowing the cause; this resulted in her telling her Le Tigre bandmates that she was finished as a singer/songwriter, that she had written all she ever intended to write. In the film Hanna says that this explanation was not true, that instead she was suffering nervous system troubles and that she did not want to admit she was unable to perform on stage. The film was also the first public revelation of certain details of Hanna's childhood and her marriage.

Appearing
The film interviews many people who observed Hanna's career including:

 Adam Horovitz, Beastie Boys, husband of Hanna
 Tamra Davis, introduced Hanna and Horovitz
 Billy Karren, lead guitarist of Bikini Kill
 Kathi Wilcox, zine writer, bandmember of Bikini Kill and the Julie Ruin
 Johanna Fateman, zine writer, bandmember of Le Tigre
 Sadie Benning, videographer, bandmember of Le Tigre
 JD Samson, visual artist, bandmember of Le Tigre
 Lynn Breedlove, punk musician, LGBT activist, writer
 Jennifer Baumgardner, feminist writer
 Kim Gordon, bassist for Sonic Youth, punk music producer
 Carrie Brownstein, guitarist/vocalist in Sleater-Kinney
 Corin Tucker, guitarist/vocalist in Sleater-Kinney
 Jen Smith, riot grrrl zine editor, punk musician
 Ann Powers, music writer
 Joan Jett, rocker and music producer
 Allison Wolfe, zine writer, punk musician
 Tavi Gevinson, founder of Style Rookie blog and Rookie Mag
 Leo Galland MD, Lyme disease expert

Hanna determined that the number of men interviewed should be minimal. She told Anderson not to feature Thurston Moore of Sonic Youth, Ian MacKaye of Fugazi, or Calvin Johnson of Beat Happening, even though she liked them and respected their opinions. She said, "I want women to be the experts. I don't want these male experts to come in to make it legitimate." Hanna wanted Tobi Vail, zine writer and bandmember of Bikini Kill to be interviewed in the film, but Vail chose to keep her privacy. In the film, Vail appears in archival footage to talk about Hanna and the punk scene.

References

External links
 The Punk Singer official website
 
 The Punk Singer, Kathleen Hanna's blog entry September 27, 2011
 The Punk Singer = A Movie About Moi, Kathleen Hanna's blog entry March 3, 2013

2013 films
2013 documentary films
American documentary films
Documentary films about singers
American independent films
Kickstarter-funded documentaries
Documentary films about punk music and musicians
Documentary films about women in music
Lyme disease
Riot grrrl films
2013 independent films
2010s English-language films
2010s American films